(female form , plural ; from Old High German , "the first", a translation of the Latin ) is a German word for a ruler as well as a princely title.  were, starting in the Middle Ages, members of the highest nobility who ruled over states of the Holy Roman Empire and later its former territories, below the ruling  (emperor) or  (king).

A Prince of the Holy Roman Empire was the reigning sovereign ruler of an Imperial State that held imperial immediacy in the boundaries of the Holy Roman Empire.

The English language uses the term "prince" for both concepts. Latin-based languages (French, Italian, Romanian, Spanish, Portuguese) also employ a single term, whereas Dutch as well as the Scandinavian and some Slavic languages use separate terms similar to those used in German (see  for the latter).

An East Asian parallel to the concept of "ruling prince" would be the Sino-Xenic word 王 (pronounced wáng in Mandarin, wong4 in Cantonese, ō in Japanese, wang in Korean and vương in Vietnamese), which commonly refers to Korean and non-East-Asian "kings", but usually refers to non-imperial monarchs (who would go by 皇帝 ("emperor" or "empress regnant") instead) in ancient China and Vietnam and therefore is frequently translated to "prince", especially for those who became rulers well after to the first adoption of the title 皇帝 by Qin Shi Huang. Some examples include China's Prince Wucheng and Vietnam's Prince Hưng Đạo. On the other hand, the son of a monarch would go by different titles, such as 皇子 ("imperial son"), 親王 ("prince of the blood") or 王子 ("royal son"). A "European sovereign prince" may have the same title as a "duke", namely 公, and "principality" is translated to the same word as "duchy", namely 公国.

From the Middle Ages on, the German designation and title of  referred to:

 a ruler or monarch (in general).

Use of the title in German
The title  (female form , female plural ) is used for the heads of princely houses of German origin (in German a ). From the Late Middle Ages, it referred to any vassal of the Holy Roman Emperor ruling over an immediate estate. Unless he also holds a higher title, such as grand duke or king, he will be known either by the formula " + [geographic origin of the dynasty]", or by the formula " + [name of the ruled territory]". These forms can be combined, as in "".

The rank of the title-holder is not determined by the title itself, but by his degree of sovereignty, the rank of his suzerain, or the age of the princely family (note the terms ; and see German nobility). However, some German dukes who did not rule over an immediate duchy did not outrank reigning princes (e.g. Dukes of Gottschee, a title held by the Princes of Auersperg. Gottschee was not an Imperial state but a territory under the Dukes of Carniola. However, Princes of Auersperg held imperial immediacy for their state of Tengen).

The hereditary rulers of the one-time principalities of Bulgaria, Serbia, Montenegro, and Albania were also all referred to in German as  before they eventually assumed the title of "king".

Other uses in German
 is used more generally in German to refer to any ruler, such as a king, a reigning duke, or a prince in the broad sense (compare Niccolò Machiavelli's ). Before the 12th century, counts were also included in this group, in accordance with its usage in the Holy Roman Empire, and in some historical or ceremonial contexts, the term  can extend to any lord.

Derived titles
Several titles were derived from the term :

  (Prince of the Empire) was a ruling Prince whose territory was part of the Holy Roman Empire. He was entitled to a vote, either individually or as a member of a voting unit, in the Imperial Diet.  was also used generically for any ruler who cast his vote in either of the s two upper chambers, the Electoral College or the College of Princes: their specific title might be king, grand duke, duke, margrave, landgrave, count palatine, burgrave, Imperial prince or Imperial count.
  (Prince of the Church) was a hierarch who held an ecclesiastic fief and Imperial princely rank, such as prince-bishops, prince-abbots, or Grand Masters of a Christian military order. All Cardinals are deemed to be Princes of the Church and considered to be equal to royal princes by the Church.
  (Prince of the Land) is a princely head of state, i.e. not just a titular prince. A  was a geopolitical entity with (feudal) statehood, whether fully independent or not. Thus, for example, the Habsburg emperors held a different regnal style in each of their  ('crown land') realms.
  (Prince-Elector) was a Prince of the Holy Roman Empire with a vote in the election of the Holy Roman Emperor, as designated by the Golden Bull of 1356 or elevated to that status subsequently. Originally, only seven princes possessed that right, of whom four were secular and three ecclesiastic. This prerogative conferred on its holders rank inferior only to that of the Emperor, regardless of the specific title attached to each Elector's principality. Properly an office of the Empire rather than a hereditary title, during the long  tenure of the Imperial throne held by the House of Habsburg, the Electorates were less distinguished from other Imperial princes by their right to choose an emperor than by the right to transmit the fief associated with the office to a single heir by primogeniture, originally unknown in Germany, rather than to divide lands among descendants in multiple appanages, allowing preservation of each Elector's territorial integrity and power.
  (Grand Prince) was a rare title in German-speaking lands, and was used primarily to translate titles borne by rulers outside the Holy Roman Empire (e.g., Russia, Tuscany). In 1765, Empress Maria Theresa proclaimed the Hungarian province of Transylvania to be a "Grand Principality", whereafter it became one of the titles of the Emperor of Austria in 1804.
  (Prince primate) referred to the head of the member states of the Napoleonic Confederation of the Rhine established in 1806, then held by the Archbishop-Elector of Mainz, . Today, it is a rarely used episcopal title: upon the elevation of the  archbishop, Christian August of Saxe-Zeitz, to a Prince of the Holy Roman Empire in 1714, his successors have born the title of Prince primate up to today.

Origins and cognates
The word  designates the head (the “first”) of a ruling house, or the head of a branch of such a house. The term “first” originates from ancient Germanic times, when the “first"” was the leader in battle.

Various cognates of the word  exist in other European languages (see extensive list under Prince), sometimes only used for a princely ruler. A derivative of the Latin  (a Republican title in Roman law, which never formally recognized a monarchic style for the executive head of state but nominally maintained the Consuls as collegial Chief magistrates) is used for a genealogical prince in some languages (e.g., in Dutch and West Frisian, where a ruler is usually called  and foarst, respectively), but a prince of the blood is always styled . In all cases, the original (German or otherwise) term may also be used.

References

Further reading
 German Empire (in German – use the English and French translated versions only with due caution)
 Danubian Monarchy Austria-Hungary (in German – use the English and French translated versions only with due caution)
 Westermann, Großer Atlas zur Weltgeschichte (in German)
 WorldStatesmen – here Germany (with specifics on the HREmpire); see also other present countries
 Etymology Online

External links
 

Austrian noble titles
German feudalism
German noble titles
German words and phrases
Heads of state
Noble titles
Princes of the Holy Roman Empire
Princes
Royal titles
Titles of nobility of the Holy Roman Empire